Lucien Gallas (March 23, 1904 – May 26, 1967) was a French stage and film actor. He was married to the actress Ginette Leclerc.

Selected filmography
 Holiday (1931)
 Billeting Order (1932)
 Little Jacques (1934)
 The Dying Land (1936)
 The Men Without Names (1937)
 Thérèse Martin (1939)
 The Benefactor (1942)
 Night Shift (1944)
 The Woman with the Orchid (1952)
 Prisoners of Darkness (1952)
 At the Edge of the City (1953)
 My Life Is Yours (1953)
 Days of Love (1954)

References

Bibliography 
 Waldman, Harry. Maurice Tourneur: The Life and Films. McFarland, 2001.

External links 
 

1904 births
1967 deaths
French male film actors
People from Oullins